{{DISPLAYTITLE:Pi1 Ursae Minoris}}

Pi1 Ursae Minoris is a common proper motion binary star system in the northern circumpolar constellation of Ursa Minor. The pair have apparent visual magnitudes of +6.58 and +7.31, with a combined magnitude of 6.1. They are located about 71 light years from the Sun. The two have an angular separation of 31.4 arc seconds, which corresponds to a physical separation of about 680 AU, and orbit each other with a period of about 13,100 years.

Both stars are solar analogs and have been listed as possible members of the Hercules-Lyra association, one of the nearest moving groups to the Sun, although this is now considered unlikely.

References

External links
 The Electronic Sky
 University of Florida Astronomy Department
 HR 1971
 Image Omicron Aurigae

G-type main-sequence stars
Binary stars
Ursae Minoris, Pi
Ursa Minor (constellation)
Durchmusterung objects
139777 139813
75809 75829
5829